A shuttle vector is a vector (usually a plasmid) constructed so that it can propagate in two different host species. Therefore, DNA inserted into a shuttle vector can be tested or manipulated in two different cell types. The main advantage of these vectors is they can be manipulated in E. coli, then used in  a system which is more difficult or slower to use (e.g. yeast).

Shuttle vectors include plasmids that can propagate in eukaryotes and prokaryotes (e.g. both Saccharomyces cerevisiae and Escherichia coli) or in different species of bacteria (e.g. both E. coli and Rhodococcus erythropolis).  There are also adenovirus shuttle vectors, which can propagate in E. coli and mammals.

Shuttle vectors are frequently used to quickly make multiple copies of the gene in E. coli (amplification).  They can also be used for in vitro experiments and modifications (e.g. mutagenesis, PCR).

One of the most common types of shuttle vectors is the yeast shuttle vector. Almost all commonly used S. cerevisiae vectors are shuttle vectors.  Yeast shuttle vectors have components that allow for replication and selection in both E. coli  cells and yeast cells.  The E. coli component of a yeast shuttle vector includes an origin of replication and a selectable marker, e.g. antibiotic resistance, beta lactamase, beta galactosidase.  The yeast component of a yeast shuttle vector includes an autonomously replicating sequence (ARS), a yeast centromere (CEN), and a yeast selectable marker (e.g. URA3, a gene that encodes an enzyme for uracil synthesis, Lodish et al. 2007).

References

 An Introduction to Genetic Analysis, Griffiths et al., 7th ed.  
 Principles of Genetics, Snustad & Simmons, 4th ed. 
 Molecular Cell Biology, Lodish et al., 6th ed.   Free online:  https://www.ncbi.nlm.nih.gov/books/bv.fcgi?rid=mcb.TOC (accessed 17 Oct 2007)
 Sherman, Fred. "9 Yeast Vectors" http://dbb.urmc.rochester.edu/labs/Sherman_f/yeast/9.html (accessed Sept. 30, 2007). 
 Yang et al., Characterization of the mobilization determinants of pAN12, a small replicon from Rhodococcus erythropolis AN12. Plasmid 57, 71-81.

Molecular biology

de:Shuttle-Plasmid